Santa Maria delle Grazie ("Holy Mary of Grace") is a church and Dominican convent in Milan, northern Italy, and a UNESCO World Heritage Site. The convent contains the mural of The Last Supper by Leonardo da Vinci, which is in the refectory.

History

Duke of Milan Francesco I Sforza ordered the construction of a Dominican convent and church at the site of a prior chapel dedicated to the Marian devotion of St Mary of the Graces. The main architect, Guiniforte Solari, designed the convent (the Gothic nave), which was completed by 1469. Construction of the church took decades. Duke Ludovico Sforza decided to have the church serve as the Sforza family burial site, and rebuilt the cloister and the apse, both completed after 1490. Ludovico's wife Beatrice was buried in the church in 1497.

The design of the apse of the church has been attributed to Donato Bramante, as his name is inscribed in a piece of marble in the church vaults delivered in 1494. However, some dispute that he worked on the church at all. According to one source, in 1492–1497 Bramante worked on the crossing and the dome as well the transept apses and the coir with apse; this source also attributes a plan and section of the building to Bramante. Some documents mention the name Amadeo, likely Giovanni Antonio Amadeo. There are similarities between this church and Amadeo's design for Santa Maria alla Fontana.

In 1543, the Titian altarpiece depicting Christ receiving the crown of thorns was installed in  the Chapel of the Holy Crown, located on the right of the nave. The painting, looted by French troops in 1797, is now in the Louvre. This chapel is frescoed with Stories of the Passion by Gaudenzio Ferrari. In the small cloister adjacent to the tribune near the door that leads to the sacristy is a fresco by Bramantino. The church also contained frescoes depicting the Resurrection and Passion by Bernardo Zenale.

Composer and cellist Giovanni Perroni served as maestro di cappella at the cathedral from 1718–1720.

World War II

During World War II, on the night of 15 August 1943, an allied aerial bombardment hit the church and the convent. Much of the refectory was destroyed, but some walls survived, including the one that holds The Last Supper, which had been sand-bagged in order to protect it. Some preservation works are done to maintain it for the future. It is believed that the current and future preservation works will keep the painting safe for many centuries to come.

Contemporary 
Nowadays the Sacrestia vecchia, or the Old Sacristy, designed and constructed by Donato Bramante, is the seat of a Dominican Cultural Centre (Centro Culturale alle Grazie), in which the brethren organize and host conferences on various themes pertaining to spirituality, philosophy, art, literature and sociology, in addition to musical concerts and artistic exhibitions.

See also
 Roman Catholic Marian churches
 History of medieval Arabic and Western European domes
 History of Italian Renaissance domes
 History of early modern period domes

References
Footnotes

Citations

Further reading

External links

Official website 

Roman Catholic churches completed in 1497
15th-century Roman Catholic church buildings in Italy
Maria delle Grazie
Renaissance architecture in Milan
World Heritage Sites in Italy
Donato Bramante church buildings
Santa Maria delle Grazie
Tourist attractions in Milan
Gothic architecture in Milan